Lancaster was built in France in 1787. She entered British ownership c.1803. In 1805 she made one voyage as a slave ship in the triangular trade in enslaved people during which a French privateer captured her in a single-ship action, but the Royal Navy recaptured her, enabling her to complete her voyage. She also recaptured a British ship. Thereafter she traded widely until she was last listed in 1825.

Career
Lancaster entered Lloyd's Register (LR) in 1804 with Stephens, master, James & Co., owner, and trade Liverpool–Barbados.

Captain John Robinson acquired a letter of marque on 21 January 1805 for Lancaster. He sailed from Liverpool on 17 February 1805, bound for West Africa to acquire captives. Lancaster, Robinson, master, was sailing from Africa to the West Indies when on 30 November 1805 a French privateer captured her.  recaptured Lancaster and sent her into Barbados. Lancaster had had four men killed and nine wounded when she was captured.

Lancaster arrived at Barbados on 7 December. There she landed 285 captives. 

Lancaster sailed from Barbados on 22 January 1806, in company with Atalanta. The two vessels separated on 5 February in a gale 

Lancaster arrived at Waterford on 4 April 1806. On her way to Liverpool she struck a submerged rock off the Saltee Islands. She had left Liverpool with 54 crew members and had suffered 10 crew deaths on her voyage.

Before she struck the rock, Lancaster recaptured Recovery, Wylie, master. Recovery had been sailing from Greenock to Cork and St Vincent when a French privateer had captured her off the Saltees. After her recapture, Recovery went into Cork.

Fate
Lancaster was last listed in Lloyd's Register in 1823 and in the Register of Shipping in 1825.

Notes

Citations

1787 ships
Ships built in France
Age of Sail merchant ships of England
Liverpool slave ships
Captured ships
Maritime incidents in 1806
Shipwrecks of Ireland
Shipwrecks in the Irish Sea